Saint Louise de Marillac High School was an all-girls Catholic secondary school in Northfield, Illinois, United States from 1967 to 1994, run by the Daughters of Charity. In 1994, Marillac merged with Loyola Academy.

The former campus of Marillac High School, designed by Schmidt, Garden & Erikson, received an award from the American Institute of Architects.

Coming Home is an initiative to gather alumnae, faculty, and the Daughters of Charity to celebrate the spirit of Marillac High School.

References

Northfield, Illinois
Former high schools in Illinois
Defunct Catholic secondary schools in Illinois